The Korea Institute for National Unification is a think tank funded by the South Korean government focusing on issues related to Korean reunification.

History 
In 1990, the institute was established as a hub of research on North Korea.

In 2010, the institute carried out an interview with 33 defectors from North Korea and found out that the spread of Hallyu, or the Korean Wave, was one of the main factors encouraging some North Koreans to risk their lives to escape to South Korea.

Publications

White Paper on Human Rights in North Korea
The Korea Institute for National Unification (KINU) opened the Center for North Korean Human Rights, in December 1994, to collect and manage professionally and systematically all source materials and objective data concerning North Korean human rights; and from 1996, KINU has been publishing every year the ‘White Paper on Human Rights in North Korea’ in Korean and in English.
White Paper on Human Rights in North Korea 2014
White Paper on Human Rights in North Korea 2013
White Paper on Human Rights in North Korea 2012

Reports and analyses
Law and Policy on Korean Unification: Analysis and Implications
Improving Human Rights in North Korea
2nd KINU-ASPI 1.5 Track Streategic Dialogue 
The Road to a ‘Happy Unification’
The Trust-building Process and Korean unification

International Journal of Korean Unification Studies
vol. 24, no. 1
23, no. 2
vol. 23, no. 1

References

External links 
 Korea Institute for National Unification

Politics of North Korea
Politics of South Korea
Think tanks established in 1990
Organizations specializing in North Korean issues